is a Japanese sprinter. He is a former Asian record holder in the  200 metres and 4×100 metres relay.

He is Matsuzaka Generation.

Suetsugu won a bronze medal in the 200 metres event at the 2003 IAAF World Championships in a time of 20.38 seconds. The same year he set an Asian record of 20.03 seconds at the Japanese national championships, and also won the 100 metres in 10.13 seconds. Participating in the 2004 Summer Olympics, he reached the second round in the 100 metres.

Suetsugu represented Japan at the 2008 Summer Olympics in Beijing. He competed at the 4×100 metres relay together with Naoki Tsukahara, Shinji Takahira and Nobuharu Asahara. In their qualification heat they placed second behind Trinidad and Tobago, but in front of the Netherlands and Brazil. Their time of 38.52 was the third fastest out of sixteen participating nations in the first round, and they qualified for the final. There they sprinted to a time of 38.15 seconds, the third fastest after the Jamaican and Trinidad teams, winning the bronze medal. The medal was upgraded to a silver after the Jamaicans were DQ'ed due to Nesta Carter's positive doping sample. He also took part in the 200 metres individual, finishing sixth in his first round heat, with a time of 20.93 seconds, which was not enough to qualify for the second round.

Personal bests

Records
100 metres
Former Japanese university record holder - 10.05 s (wind: +1.9 m/s) (Mito, 6 May 2002)
200 metres
Former Asian record holder - 20.03 s (wind: +0.6 m/s) (Yokohama, 7 June 2003)
Current Japanese record holder - 20.03 s (wind: +0.6 m/s) (Yokohama, 7 June 2003)
Former Japanese university record holder - 20.26 s (wind: -0.9 m/s) (Yokohama, 9 September 2000)
4 × 100 m relay
Former Asian record holder - 38.03 s (relay leg: 2nd) (Osaka, 1 September 2007)
Former Japanese university record holder - 38.57 s (relay leg: 2nd) (Tokyo, 29 September 2001)
Medley relay (100m×200m×300m×400m)
Former Japanese university record holder - 1:50.21 s (relay leg: 2nd) (Yokohama, 15 September 2001)

 with Naoki Tsukahara, Shinji Takahira, and Nobuharu Asahara
 with Hisashi Miyazaki, Toshiyuki Fujimoto, and Masayuki Okusako

International competition record

National championships
He has won the individual national championship 6 times:
2 wins in the 100 metres (2003, 2004)
4 wins in the 200 metres (2001, 2003, 2006, 2007)

References

External links

Shingo Suetsugu at JAAF 

1980 births
Living people
People from Kumamoto
Sportspeople from Kumamoto Prefecture
Japanese male sprinters
Olympic male sprinters
Olympic athletes of Japan
Olympic silver medalists for Japan
Olympic bronze medalists for Japan
Olympic bronze medalists in athletics (track and field)
Athletes (track and field) at the 2000 Summer Olympics
Athletes (track and field) at the 2004 Summer Olympics
Athletes (track and field) at the 2008 Summer Olympics
Medalists at the 2008 Summer Olympics
Asian Games gold medalists for Japan
Asian Games silver medalists for Japan
Asian Games medalists in athletics (track and field)
Athletes (track and field) at the 2002 Asian Games
Athletes (track and field) at the 2006 Asian Games
Medalists at the 2002 Asian Games
Medalists at the 2006 Asian Games
World Athletics Championships athletes for Japan
World Athletics Championships medalists
Japan Championships in Athletics winners
Tokai University alumni